David Benjamin Storer (born 31 March 1968) is a former English cricketer. Storer was a right-handed batsman who bowled right-arm medium pace. He was born in Grantham, Lincolnshire.

Storer made his debut for Lincolnshire in the 1987 Minor Counties Championship against Staffordshire. Storer played Minor counties cricket for Lincolnshire from 1987 to 1995, which included 47 Minor Counties Championship matches and 10 MCCA Knockout Trophy matches. He made his List A debut against Gloucestershire in the 1990 NatWest Trophy. He played 2 further List A matches for Lincolnshire, against Nottinghamshire in the 1991 NatWest Trophy and Glamorgan in the 1994 NatWest Trophy. In his 3 matches, he scored 29 runs at an average of 9.66, with a high score of 28. He took a single wicket with the ball, which came when against Nottinghamshire, with Storer dismissing Derek Randall for the cost of 17 runs from 5 overs.

In June 1995 David entered the record books being the first Lincolnshire batsman to score centuries in both innings of a match, and become only the fifth to do it of all time. In the match against Buckinghamshire he scored 150 not out in the first innings and 102 in the second as Lincolnshire won by 150 runs

References

External links
David Storer at ESPNcricinfo
David Storer at CricketArchive

1968 births
Living people
People from Grantham
English cricketers
Lincolnshire cricketers